Rapmasters: From Tha Priority Vaults, Vol. 7 is the seventh volume of an eight volume budget compilation series released by Priority Records throughout 1996 and 1997. Like almost all of the six previous volumes, no fully uncut explicit version of this release exists meaning that all songs appear here in their censored versions.

Track listing
 When They Gone (Master P)
 Straight Outta Compton (N.W.A)
 Gangstafied (Kane & Abel Featuring Master P and Mo B. Dick)
 It's Real (Paris)
 Only If You Want It (Eazy-E)
 Blast If I Have To (E-A-Ski)
 Drama (Ras Kass Featuring Coolio)
 Steel On a Mission '96 (Lil 1/2 Dead)
 You Want Me (The Conscious Daughters)

References

1997 compilation albums
Priority Records compilation albums
Gangsta rap compilation albums
Hip hop compilation albums
Record label compilation albums